Ed Burke (Edward Andrew Burke; born March 4, 1940) is an American hammer thrower best known for carrying the flag of the United States at the Olympics in Los Angeles 1984.  He competed at the 1964, 1968 and 1984 Olympics and placed 7th, 12th and 18th, respectively. He set his personal best in 1984, aged 44.

Burke came to the 1968 Summer Olympics as a favorite, after setting the U.S. record of 235' 11" at the 1967 AAU Championships in Bakersfield, California (the same meet Jim Ryun ran his long standing 3:51.1 mile record), then the number two performance in history. After being (unjustly) called for a foul on his first two throws, he was so disappointed in his results that he retired from the sport following the Olympics. In 1979, he watched the World Cup on television with his daughters who had never seen dad throw. He marveled at the relative small size of champion Sergei Litvinov (URS). Just shy of his 40th birthday, he decided to give the Hammer one more whirl. After training he made the United States team at the first IAAF World Championships, and achieved his lifetime best of 243' 11" in the process of qualifying for his third Olympics at age 44 (a feat his contemporary Al Oerter also attempted and failed that year). He was the first American to achieve qualifying for Olympic teams 20 years apart (since equaled by Francie Larrieu-Smith, also from the San Jose area, in 1992). Being the oldest member of the team and a remarkable story, he was selected to carry the flag, which he did with one hand, in the hometown Olympic Opening Ceremonies by the team captains.

Ed Burke attended college at San Jose State University.

Promoting throwing
Following the Olympics, he again retired to tend the Los Gatos Athletic Club.  He joined fellow Olympian, Discus Thrower Mac Wilkins in forming Explorer Post 813 in San Jose, California, dedicated to introducing boys and girls to the art of throwing.  They constructed throwing cages next to Highway 85,  enlisting the help of other world-class athletes training in the San Jose area.  30 graduates of their program have gone on to throw for NCAA Division I schools, two of them Dave Popejoy and Kevin McMahon made U.S. Olympic teams.

Masters
21 years after his second retirement, Burke returned to competition in the 65-year-old division. and promptly set the world record for his age division.  After turning 70 in 2010, he did it again in his new age division.

Achievements

References

1940 births
American male hammer throwers
Athletes (track and field) at the 1964 Summer Olympics
Athletes (track and field) at the 1968 Summer Olympics
Athletes (track and field) at the 1984 Summer Olympics
Olympic track and field athletes of the United States
World Athletics Championships athletes for the United States
Living people
World record holders in masters athletics
American masters athletes
People from Ukiah, California
Track and field athletes from San Jose, California
San Jose State Spartans men's track and field athletes